Red Bradley was an American baseball pitcher in the Negro leagues. He played with the Baltimore Black Sox in 1927.

External links
 and Seamheads

Baltimore Black Sox players
Year of birth unknown
Year of death unknown
Baseball pitchers